Takleh-ye Bakhsh may refer to:
 Takleh-ye Bakhsh 1
 Takleh-ye Bakhsh 2